Two ships of the United States Navy have been named American. 

, part of the Stone Fleet sunk at Charleston, South Carolina. Some references to this ship name it as the America
, was a freighter built in 1900 and acquired by the US Navy early in 1918 and returned to her original owners in 1919

See also

United States Navy ship names